Jan Reehorst (born 21 March 1923) is a Dutch former politician.

Reehorst became a member of the Labour Party in 1946. From 1953 until 1973, he was member of the municipal council of Rotterdam. Between 1956 and 1967, he was a member of the House of Representatives. In 1973, he became mayor of Velsen and from 1977 till 1984 he was mayor of Haarlem.

In 2013, he received the Willem Drees-penning award for 65 years of continuous membership of the Labour Party. In 2016, Reehorst's work as mayor of Haarlem was part of an exhibition on Haarlem's mayors at Museum Haarlem, which also included former mayors Elisabeth Schmitz, Jaap Pop and Bernt Schneiders.

References

External links 
 Biography of Jan Reehorst, Parlement.com

1923 births
Living people
Labour Party (Netherlands) politicians
Municipal councillors of Rotterdam
Mayors of Haarlem
Mayors in North Holland
People from Velsen